Shablu (also Romanized as Shablū; also known as Shablī) is a village in Hir Rural District, in the Hir District of Ardabil County, Ardabil Province, Iran. At the 2006 census, its population was 617 in 130 families.

References 

Towns and villages in Ardabil County